Liu Dong (born 30 August 1968) is a Chinese boxer. He competed in the men's featherweight event at the 1988 Summer Olympics.

References

1968 births
Living people
Chinese male boxers
Olympic boxers of China
Boxers at the 1988 Summer Olympics
Place of birth missing (living people)
Featherweight boxers